Mohammadabad-e Seyyedha (also romanized as Moḩammadābād-e Seyyedhā; also known as Moḩammadābād, Moḩammadābād-e Sādāt, and Moḩammadābād-e Seyyedān) is a village in Khatunabad Rural District, in the Central District of Shahr-e Babak County, Kerman Province, Iran. At the 2006 census, its population was 31, in 6 families.

References 

Populated places in Shahr-e Babak County